Halai may refer to:
Halai (Boeotia), a town of ancient Boeotia
Halai (Cilicia), a town of ancient Cilicia
Frank Halai (born 1988), New Zealand rugby player
Vijay Halai (born 1992), Indian cricketer
Battle of Halai (1894), in the First Italo-Ethiopian War